Planter is an unincorporated community in Madison County, in the U.S. state of Georgia.

History
A post office called Planter was established in 1880, and remained in operation until 1903. Planter was so named on account of its location within an agricultural district. A variant name is "Planters".

References

Unincorporated communities in Madison County, Georgia
Unincorporated communities in Georgia (U.S. state)